Two submarines of the French Navy have borne the name Gymnote (“Electric Eel”):

 , a pioneering French Navy submarine of the 1880s
 , an experimental French Navy submarine of the 1960s

French Navy ship names